Sujin may be:

Places
Nellikkunnam , Kottarakkara Kollam  Kerala,India

People
Emperor Sujin of Japan, traditionally said to have reigned in the 1st century B.C.
Soo-jin, Korean unisex given name
Sujin (สุจินต์), Thai unisex given name
Sujin Boriharnwanaket (born 1927), Thai female Buddhist writer
Sujin Naknayom (born 1979), Thai male footballer

Other
An old name for the Nivaclé language of South America